Veljko Urošević (born 27 February 1978 in Belgrade, SR Serbia, Yugoslavia) is a Serbian rower.

He participated at the 2004 Summer Olympics and finished first in the B final of the men's lightweight four.

Urošević graduated from Columbia University in 2003.

References

Veljko Urošević biography and Olympic results at Sports-reference.com

1978 births
Living people
Serbian male rowers
Olympic rowers of Serbia and Montenegro
Rowers at the 2004 Summer Olympics
European Rowing Championships medalists
Columbia Lions rowers